is a railway station on the East Japan Railway Company (JR East) Tsugaru Line located in the town of Imabetsu, Aomori Prefecture, Japan.

Lines

Station layout
Imabetsu Station has one ground-level  side platform serving a single bi-directional line. The station originally had an island platform, but currently only the southbound portion is in use. The station building consists of a waiting room only, and is unattended.

History
Imabetsu Station was opened on October 21, 1958 as a station on the Japanese National Railways (JNR). With the privatization of the JNR on April 1, 1987, it came under the operational control of JR East. It has been unattended since July 1, 2003.

Surrounding area

Imabetsu Town Hall

See also
 List of Railway Stations in Japan

External links

 

Stations of East Japan Railway Company
Railway stations in Aomori Prefecture
Tsugaru Line
Imabetsu, Aomori
Railway stations in Japan opened in 1958